Murtadha al-Yusuf (born 1984) is an Iraqi journalist, media consultant, Editor-in-Chief for Kurdistan 24 Arabic service and director of Hatha al-Youm.

Journalism
Al-Yusuf worked as a radio broadcaster and senior editor for several local and international media outlets. He was a journalist covering the war against ISIS in Iraq between the years 2016 to 2017. He was the correspondent of BBC Xtra and writer for BBC Online in 2013 and 2016 and Editor in Chief for Kurdistan 24 Arabic service.

Education
Al-Yusuf completed a bachelor's degree in the English language.

References

1984 births

Living people
Iraqi journalists
Arab journalists
Kurdistan 24 people